The North American League (officially known as the North American Baseball League) was an independent baseball league that began play in the 2011 season. The league consisted of a merger of three independent leagues, the Northern League of Illinois, United League Baseball of Texas, and the Golden Baseball League based in the Western United States and Western Canada and was a last-ditch effort to save the teams in said league. The league's chairman of the board was Dave Kaval, former CEO of Diamond Sports and Entertainment (owners of the now-defunct GBL), league president was Brian MacInnes and main board member was James C. Peters.

After playing two seasons, the North American League folded.

Travel issues and division alignment

To keep travel costs from being a financial issue for the teams, in 2011 the league played in a division structure where teams played 75% of their 96-game schedule within their division and made just one lengthy roadtrip of 12 games outside their division.  The season concluded with divisional playoffs followed by a North American Championship Series.

As of the 2012 season there was no inter division play.  The North and United played all games within their own division. The only play outside the division was supposed to be a 3 out of 5 games for the North American Baseball League championship.  The United Division refused to play a championship series.

The 2012 United Division championship series saw the Edinburg Roadrunners defeating the Fort Worth Cats, three games to none. In the North Division championship series, the San Rafael Pacifics topped Na Koa Ikaika Maui, two games to one.

Level of play
The roster rules allowed all teams to keep their existing players from 2010. The three predecessor leagues had contracts of 35 players purchased by Major League organizations in 2010.  In addition, these three leagues placed half of the prospects on the Baseball America Top Indy Prospects List and six of the 14 players on the 2010 Baseball America All-Indy First Team.

Downfall of the league
On March 27, 2012, it was announced that Diamond Sports & Entertainment walked away as management of the league.  As the 2012 season came to a close, the league finally folded due to financial instability and franchises withdrawing from the league.

Teams that played

Teams that never played
 Henderson RoadRunners of Henderson, Nevada – relocated from St. George, Utah and were to have been a charter member of the league, but Morse Field was not ready to play and the franchise folded one year later.

See also
 2011 North American League season
 Golden Baseball League
 Northern League
 United League Baseball

Notes and references

External links
North American League

 
Defunct professional sports leagues in the United States
Defunct independent baseball leagues in the United States
Defunct baseball leagues in Canada
Sports leagues established in 2011
Sports leagues disestablished in 2012
Professional sports leagues in Canada
2011 establishments in Canada
2011 establishments in the United States
2012 disestablishments in Canada
2012 disestablishments in the United States